Bautista Saubidet Birkner (born 28 November 1995) is an Argentine sailor. He participated in the men's RS:X event at the 2016 Summer Olympics. He also won the Pan American gold medal in the RS:X event at the 2019 Lima. He is 3 times South American Champion and Youth European Champion.

He started windsurfing at the age of 11. His brother Francisco Saubidet Birkner is also an Olympic Athlete. He is the son of Magdalena Birkner.

References

External links 
 
 
 
 

1995 births
Living people
Argentine people of French descent
Argentine people of German descent
Argentine male sailors (sport)
Olympic sailors of Argentina
Sailors at the 2016 Summer Olympics – RS:X
Sailors at the 2010 Summer Youth Olympics
Pan American Games medalists in sailing
Pan American Games gold medalists for Argentina
Sailors at the 2019 Pan American Games
Medalists at the 2019 Pan American Games
Argentine windsurfers